USS Naugatuck may refer to the following ships:

  the name incorrectly attributed to the U.S. Revenue Cutter E.A. Stevens (later renamed USRC Naugatuck), a semi-submersible armored gunboat employed by the Revenue Cutter Service 1861–1889
 , was a medium harbor tugboat taken over from the U.S. Army in 1963.

See also
 , was a U.S. Coast Guard patrol boat commissioned in June 1926.
 , was a U.S. Coast Guard harbor tug launched in March 1939.

United States Navy ship names